The Onslaught are a fictional team of state sponsored super powered Quraci terrorists published by DC Comics. They first appeared in Suicide Squad #1, and were created by John Ostrander and Luke McDonnell.

History
The Onslaught is a team of super-powered international terrorists-for-hire operating out of the outlaw nation of Qurac. The team was created and guided by Qurac's President Marlos and had accepted, as its first commission, the assignment of killing the President of the United States. Former Suicide Squad member Jess Bright, now a Soviet operative named Koshchei helped bio-engineer candidates for the team. At its inception, the Jihad was infiltrated by Nemesis and Nightshade, members of the advance team of the Suicide Squad, and was the target of a preemptive attack by the Squad (as seen in Suicide Squad #1 and #2).

After their first clash with the Suicide Squad, Raza Kattuah now calling himself Rustam formed a second team based in an old World War II fortress called Jotunheim in southern Qurac. The name translates as "Land of the Giants", because the Germans believed only a race of giants could have built those mountains. Rustam used this team to terrorize civilians in New York City. Ravan, Ifrit and Agni were captured. Manticore and Jaculi were killed, but Rustam and Badb were able to escape. Ravan was eventually recruited by the Suicide Squad. Rick Flag carried out an unauthorized solo mission to Qurac which resulted in the destruction of Jotunheim, killing Rustam and countless Jihad members. The man known as Kobra would later kill Ravan while engaged in single combat.

Agni assembled a small three-person team to free Quraci President Marlo from United States custody. He brought along Badb, and the Atlantean renegade known as Piscator, a self-styled Janissary. The Suicide Squad preemptively substituted Nemesis for President Marlo. At the same time, Israel's heroes, the Mossad superteam known as the Hayoth were involved in a covert mission on U.S. soil, a failed attempt to abduct Marlo.

As revealed in Suicide Squad #50, Jess Bright had survived the Yeti attack in Tibet, that killed most of the original Suicide Squad. Jess was rescued by the Red Chinese and given a new name Yen Wang (King of the Devils) and was made the head of a secret Chinese project to develop metahumans alongside a Chinese scientist named Deng Zho-Zhi. But due to frostbite his nose, lips, toes and fingers all had to be amputated. Deng Zho-Zhi's laboratory was raided by Chinese government officials, and he revealed to Bright that he was actually a dissident and probably would be taken away for reeducation. Jess is recruited from prison by Major Zastrow of the Red Shadows. The Russians gave him cybernetic hands, and cybernetic feet that allowed him to walk again. Zastrow changes Bright's codename to Koschei the Deathless and put him to work on maintaining and improving the Rocket Reds. The Russians then sent him to Qurac where he was put in charge of the program to develop Qurac's metahuman program, Jaculi, Manticore and the Djinn were all his creations, but he was killed when Rick Flag destroyed Jotunheim with an atomic bomb. The Quracis were able to revive him as a cybernetic zombie using technology he himself had created, his body was dead and his mind was a digital recording. As part of an elaborate revenge against Rick Flag, Koschei kidnaps his son by Karin Grace, Rick Flag Jr. Unbeknownst to Koschei Flag had apparently died in the nuclear detonation that destroyed Jotunheim. Nemesis eventually convinced him to set the boy free, and he appeared to have been destroyed by an explosion that he set off.

Agni assembled yet another Onslaught team with the help of Njara Kattuah son of Rustam. This new team's mission of vengeance against America was short-lived. After disposing of a team of Checkmate Knights who had tracked them as far as Markovia, the homeland of Geo-Force, they were discovered on an airplane bound for Gotham by the Outsiders, who were also on the flight, and a fight broke out onboard the plane. The battle in midair nearly cost some of the Outsiders their lives, but Manticore III and Dahak both ended up dying instead, with Djinn presumably killed as well. The fight is ended after it forces the plane to make a hard landing in Gotham, with all the surviving Onslaught members except for Dervish escaping. Dervish later joined the Outsiders in order to find Manticore, who she thought was alive, remaining with them until she discovered what happened to Manticore. In anger she joined the second Strikeforce Kobra. After a clash with the Outsiders, she was captured and imprisoned in the Slab, she later escaped when the Joker engineered a jailbreak (as seen in Joker: Last Laugh #3).

Njara later returned with a new team including Antiphon, Tolteca, Hyve and Digital Djinn (Suicide Squad (vol. 2) #10). They succeeded in kidnapping Amanda Waller as part of an elaborate revenge, and in killing Squad members Havana (slain by Rustam) and Modem (slain by Digital Djinn). They were no match for the Squad when members of the Justice Society of America were drafted to help. The second Rustam was killed by Deadshot and the other members escaped custody.

Roster

Team one (Suicide Squad #1-2)

 Chimera - She was actually Suicide Squad member Nightshade.
 Djinn - His body was reduced to a binary code and stored in microchips within a magnetic bottle. Enchantress blew up his bottle, presumably destroying him. 
 Jaculi - A young Bedouin with the ability of moving at super-speed in three second spurts. He carried an assortment of explosive javelins. Jaculi was slain by Captain Boomerang.
 Manticore - A super strong cyborg from Greece, he was slain by Deadshot. Manticore is named after the mythical namesake. During the events of Blackest Night, Manticore's corpse is reanimated as a member of the Black Lantern Corps alongside several fallen Suicide Squad members.
 Colonel Mushtaq - He was actually Nemesis in an undercover role.
 Ravan - Last surviving thugee, his back was broken in single combat with the Bronze Tiger.
 Rustam - Raza Kattuah was the first team leader, named after Rostam, a mythic hero in Persian folklore. Rustam wields a scimitar artifact from Skartaris which could generate fiery plasma that could seemingly cut through anything, and open dimensional portals. The scimitar uses its wielder's life force as a power source. According to Raza he was a US covert operative in Qurac who was apparently betrayed by the United States, a situation which led to the deaths of his entire family.

Team two (Suicide Squad #17-19)
 Agni - Agni is an Asian Indian pyrokinetic who could create progressively larger fireballs by snapping his fingers. He is named after Agni, the Hindu god of fire.
 Badb - A teenaged Irish telepath who could mentally instill panic and hatred. She is named after Badb, the Celtic goddess of war.
 Ifrit - She was a new artificial intelligence, similar to Djinn, based on the brain patterns of Mindboggler, whose mental engrams were salvaged by Quraci scientists, and twisted to induce extreme aggression and hate; she was healed of this by sentient Israeli computer Dybbuk and fell in love with him. She is named after the Persian spirits known as Ifrits.
 Jaculi - The second Jaculi was a woman of unknown nationality with the speed and weapons of the original. She was slain by Deadshot.
 Koshchei The Deathless - Jess Bright, former member of the original Suicide Squad. He could animate the dead using specialized electronic implants, controlling them via telepresence; this control was accidentally broken by Shade the Changing Man. In Russian folklore Koshchei the Deathless is a powerful necromancer.
 Manticore - The second Manticore, also of unknown nationality, was tougher than his predecessor; he was slain by Duchess (Lashina).
 Ravan - Master assassin now wearing a cybernetic harness because of his broken back. After being captured by the Bronze Tiger he joins the Suicide Squad.
 Rustam - Team leader and the same operative.

Team three (Suicide Squad #59-62)
 Agni - Team leader for this mission.
 Badb - The same operative.
 Piscator - An Atlantean (see Atlantis) renegade and self-styled Janissary.

Team four (Outsiders (vol. 2) #5-6)
 Agni - Second in command for this mission.
 Dahak - A demon who used the body of an old Quraci woman as its host. In Persian mythology Aži Dahāka is the god of evil. This demon is killed when an airplane tail crushed it to death.
 Dervish - Nema, a female martial artist, she is romantically tied to Manticore III. Nema is named after the traditional dervishes. She later joined to Strikeforce Kobra.
 Djinn - The original Djinn restored by the group's technicians. He is presumably destroyed again after Sebastian Faust traps him in a hand-held TV that he throws into Agni's flames.
 Manticore - The third Manticore was Saied, who was romantically tied to Dervish. He was accidentally killed during a fight with Charlie Wylde of the Outsiders.
 Rustam - Njara Kattuah, team leader and the son of the original Rustam. Njara has demonstrated pyrokinetic abilities, but is unknown if they were internal, or if he had access to his father's scimitar.

Team five (Suicide Squad (vol. 2) #10-12)
 Antiphon -  A super speedster from Greece. The name  is based on the term Antiphon (opposing voice).
 Digital Djinn - New more powerful creation based on the original Djinn.
 Hyve - A hulking creature able to separate into smaller and smaller copies of itself.
 Rustam - Njara Kattuah, team leader. He is slain by Deadshot.
 Tolteca -  A powerful warrior woman and cannibal. Her name is derived from the Toltecs of Mexico.

In other media

Television
Onslaught appears in Young Justice: Outsiders, consisting of Psimon, Devastation, Mammoth, Shimmer, Icicle Jr., the Terror Twins, and Holocaust. This version of the group serves Queen Bee and the Light. Additionally, Jaculi appears as an assassin and member of Baron Bedlam's metahuman trafficking ring who is sent to kill Markovia's king and queen before Jaculi is killed in turn by Bedlam.

Miscellaneous
 Onslaught appears in the non-canonical Arrow tie-in comic series, Arrow: Season 2.5. This version of the group is led by Khem-Adam, who wished to bring Kahndaq back to its traditional roots, only to run afoul of the Suicide Squad.
 The Young Justice incarnation of Onslaught appears in the tie-in comic Young Justice: Targets, with the addition of Match.

References

External links
DCU Guide: Suicide Squad #1

Comic book terrorist organizations
DC Comics supervillain teams
Fictional Indian people
Characters created by John Ostrander
Comics characters introduced in 1987
Fictional mercenaries